Hillcrest Park is a public park located in Thunder Bay, Ontario. The Park is located in the city's north end (formerly Port Arthur, Ontario). The Park's location provides scenic views of the city, the harbour, and the Sleeping Giant. Located within the park is a World War II memorial for the Lake Superior Regiment. The memorial includes an honour roll of those killed in action, and a Universal Carrier; a vehicle used by the regiment. Located at the north end of the park is the Sunken Gardens with over 70 varieties of flowers in a unique configuration of walkways and benches.

References

Parks in Thunder Bay